The Rt Rev William Arthur Holbech (14 December 1850 – 7 March 1930) was an Anglican bishop in the first half of the 20th century.

Biography
Born on 14 December 1850, he was the third son of the Rev. Charles Holbech. Educated at Eton and Brasenose College, Oxford, he was ordained in 1874. 

Following a curacy at St Mark’s, Lakenham, Holbech emigrated to South Africa where he was a Mission Priest before promotion to be the Archdeacon of Kimberley and Rector of St Cyprian's Church (where he served through the Siege of Kimberley), then Dean of Bloemfontein. In 1905 he became Bishop of St Helena, a post he held until his death on 7 March 1930.

Notes

1850 births
People educated at Eton College
Alumni of Brasenose College, Oxford
Anglican archdeacons in Africa
Deans of Bloemfontein
Anglican bishops of St Helena
20th-century Anglican Church of Southern Africa bishops
1930 deaths